Gough's Cave is located in Cheddar Gorge on the Mendip Hills, in Cheddar, Somerset, England.
and contains a variety of large chambers and rock formations. It contains the Cheddar Yeo, the largest underground river system in Britain.

History 

The initial sections of the cave, previously known as Sand Hole, were accessible prior to the 19th century. Between 1892 and 1898 a retired sea captain, Richard Cox Gough, who lived in Lion House in Cheddar, found, excavated and opened to the public further areas of the cave, up to Diamond Chamber, which is the end of the show cave today. Electric lighting was installed in the show caves in 1899.

The cave is susceptible to flooding often lasting for up to 48 hours, however in the Great Flood of 1968 the flooding lasted for three days.

The extensive flooded parts of the cave system were found and explored between 1985 and 1990.

Human remains and occupation

Magdalenian culture and remains

The cave contained skeletal remains of animals and of humans dated by ultra-filtration carbon dating to around the end of the Last Glacial Maximum some 14,700 years ago. These show cut-marks and breakage consistent with de-fleshing and eating. Skull fragments represent from 5 to 7 humans, including a young child of about 3 years and two adolescents. The brain cases appear to have been prepared as drinking cups or containers, a tradition found in other Magdalenian sites across Europe.

The remains currently reside in the Natural History Museum in London, with a replica in the Cheddar Man and the Cannibals museum in the Gorge.
Other human remains have also been found in the cave.

Ancestry
In 2022 nuclear and mitochondrial DNA from a female found in the cave was analysed. Like human remains from other Magdalenian sites, her genome shares most drift with the individuals belonging to the ~19,000–14,000-year-old Goyet Q2 genetic cluster.

Diet
Isotopic analysis on the remains showed a diet consisting of terrestrial herbivores such as red deer, aurochs and horses.

Treatment of corpses
3D microscopy showed that the flesh had been removed from the bones using the same tools and techniques used on animal bones. The human skulls of the same date found at the cave around 1987, may have been deliberately fashioned into ritual drinking cups or bowls. These de-fleshing marks and secondary treatment of human material at Gough’s Cave, (also found at other Magdalenian culture sites such as Brillenhöhle and Hohle Fels in Germany and Maszycka Cave in Poland), has been taken as evidence of cannibalism.

Rope-making tool
A perforated baton, made of reindeer antler, was found in Gough's Cave. Like other similar artifacts, it has been interpreted as being a device for making rope. Grooves around each hole would have held plant fibres in place. The existence of these tools at different locations indicates rope-making had already become an important human activity by the Upper Paleolithic age. "These devices were called batons and were originally thought to have been carried by chiefs as badges of rank. However, they had holes with spirals round them and we now realise they must have been used to make or manipulate ropes." The ropes could then have been used to construct fishing nets, snares and traps, bows and arrows, clothing and containers for carrying food. Heavy objects, such as sleds, could now be hauled on ropes while spear points could be lashed to poles.

Another contemporaneous human group in the British Isles
A Palaeolithic individual from the non-Magdalenian burial site in Kendrick's Cave on the coast of North Wales, who lived at approximately the same time as the Magdalenian humans in Gough’s Cave, shares most drift with the individuals belonging to the ~14,000–7,000-year-old Villabruna genetic cluster. Her diet included a large element of fish-eating mammals such as seals. This suggests that at least two different human groups, with different genetic affinities and different dietary and cultural behaviours, were present in Britain during the Late Glacial Interstadial.

Younger Dryas depopulation

Centuries after the Magdalenian use of Gough's Cave, the Younger Dryas cold period made the area of the current British Isles unsuitable for human life.

Cheddar Man
In 1903 the remains of a human male, since named Cheddar Man, were found a short distance inside Gough's Cave. He is Britain's oldest complete human skeleton, having been dated to approximately 7150 BC. His genetic markers suggested (based on their associations in modern populations whose phenotypes are known) that he probably had green eyes, lactose intolerance, dark curly or wavy hair, and, less certainly, dark to very dark skin. Further genetic analysis shows that he is part of the Western Hunter-Gatherer population, and not closely related to the much earlier Magdalenian individuals found in the same cave. About 85% of his ancestry can be modelled as coming from the ~14,000–7,000-year-old Villabruna genetic cluster, and only c. 15% from the Goyet Q2 cave cluster which is associated with Magdalenian culture.

Access and description 

The first  of the cave are open to the public as a show cave, and this stretch contains most of the more spectacular formations. The greater part of the cave's length is made up of the river passage, which is accessible only by cave diving.

Beyond the show cave 

Gough's cave contains long stretches of completely flooded river passage. From a point relatively close to the areas of the cave open to the public, the cave-divers' descent into Sump 1a begins through a tight passage known as Dire Straits. The bottom of that passage opens into the river passage, which is several meters across.

This chamber is the largest chamber currently found in the Cheddar caves.

Air is again reached at Sheppard's Crook, which is followed by Sump 3. Following Sump 3, a wide ascending passage continues for  before reaching an impassable blockage, still below the water's surface.

See also 
 Caves of the Mendip Hills

References

External links
 
 Official website
 The Caves of Cheddar Gorge by Tony Oldham
 Bones from a Cheddar Gorge cave show that cannibalism helped Britain's earliest settlers survive the ice age, Robin McKie, The Guardian, 20 June 2010
 Silvia M. Bello, Rosalind Wallduck, Simon A. Parfitt, Chris B. Stringer. An Upper Palaeolithic engraved human bone associated with ritualistic cannibalism, August 9, 2017.

Caves of the Mendip Hills
Limestone caves
Prehistoric cannibalism
Show caves in the United Kingdom
Archaeological sites in England
Cheddar, Somerset
Incidents of cannibalism